Simona de Silvestro (born 1 September 1988) is a Swiss-Italian racing driver, who is currently employed by Porsche as a factory driver. She has previously driven for Amlin Andretti in the 2015/16 season of the FIA Formula E Championship as well as several years competing in the IndyCar Series. Her nicknames are the "Iron Maiden" and "Swiss Miss".

Racing career

Junior formulae
She raced for Newman Wachs Racing's Nuclear Clean Air Energy-Entergy team in the Atlantic Championship in 2008 and for Team Stargate Worlds in 2009.  She won the Atlantic race at the 2008 Grand Prix of Long Beach, making her the second woman to win in that series – after Katherine Legge – and providing NWR with its first win. She won four times during the 2009 season and led in points for most of the season, but ultimately finished third in the standings after retiring on the first lap during the season finale at Mazda Raceway Laguna Seca.

De Silvestro participated in an IndyCar Series test over 8–9 December 2009 at Sebring International Raceway, a joint effort between HVM Racing and Team Stargate Worlds.

IndyCar

De Silvestro competed full-time in the IndyCar Series for HVM Racing for the 2010 season. On 22 May 2010, she qualified in the 22nd position for the 2010 Indianapolis 500. She finished the race in 14th position, and earned Indianapolis 500 Rookie of the Year honors. She suffered a burned right hand after a fiery crash at the Firestone 550 at Texas Motor Speedway on 5 June 2010. Her team strongly criticized IndyCar Series safety officials for their response to that accident. For the season, de Silvestro started 17 races, finished ten, and recorded two top-10 finishes, with a best finish of eighth at Mid-Ohio.  She finished 19th overall in the series standings and was runner-up to Alex Lloyd for rookie of the year honors.

The 2011 season began with fourth- and ninth-place finishes at St. Petersburg and Barber; however the next race, at Long Beach, was not as successful: she started 18th and finished 20th. At the next race, the São Paulo Indy 300, an accident between her and Hélio Castroneves put her nine laps down, after the race was postponed to the next morning due to severe rain conditions. She started 13th and finished 20th, nine laps down, but recorded the fastest lap of the race.

She received second degree burns on her right hand and superficial burns on her left hand in a crash during practice for the 2011 Indianapolis 500 on 19 May. The crash, which sent her car sailing into the catch fence before flipping and landing on its left tires, was caused by a mechanical failure in the left rear of her No. 78 Dallara-Honda. On 21 May, using her backup car, she qualified 24th for the race with a four-lap average of 224.392 mph.

After a crash at the Milwaukee Mile during qualifying, de Silvestro was cleared to drive in the race, but withdrew after experiencing dizziness and impaired vision. At the next race, in Iowa, she was not cleared to compete, due to continuing dizziness.

De Silvestro missed round 13 of the season at Sonoma, after being refused entry to the United States. De Silvestro said she did not know why she was turned away. She finished 20th overall in the 2011 series standings.

De Silvestro returned to HVM Racing for the 2012 IndyCar Series season, piloting the No. 78 Nuclear Clean Air Energy sponsored Dallara-Lotus.  The entry was one of five cars to start the season powered by the new Lotus engine.  The Lotus proved to be significantly underpowered compared to the Chevrolet and Honda engines used by the rest of the field.  By the end of May, all entrants other than de Silvestro's No. 78 had abandoned the Lotus powerplant and switched to either Chevy or Honda.  De Silvestro was saddled for the entire season with the inferior Lotus.  The underpowered engine made it impossible for de Silvestro to be competitive, resulting in consistently poor qualifying and race results.  On several occasions the car was black flagged for failing to maintain the minimum safe speed, including the 2012 Indianapolis 500.  For the season, de Silvestro qualified for all 15 races on the schedule, started 14, and finished 6.  Her best finish was 14th at Detroit and Iowa.  She finished 24th overall in the series standings.

On 30 October 2012, de Silvestro signed on with KV Racing Technology for the 2013 IndyCar Series season, driving the No. 78 Dallara-Chevrolet with sponsorship from Nuclear Clean Air Energy. De Silvestro joined veteran driver Tony Kanaan to make KV Racing Technology a two-car team for the 2013 season. On 5 October 2013 at the Grand Prix of Houston, de Silvestro finished second in the first race for her first podium finish, joining Danica Patrick and Sarah Fisher as the only women in IndyCar history to record a podium finish.

On 2 April 2015, de Silvestro announced she would drive the Andretti Autosport No. 29 Honda in the 2015 IndyCar Series season in an attempt to make the Indianapolis 500.  De Silvestro finished fourth in the second race of the season, the Indy Grand Prix of Louisiana.

On 19 January 2021, Paretta Autosport announced they would make their Indycar debut at the 2021 Indianapolis 500 with de Silvestro as the driver in the no. 16 Rocket Pro Chevrolet.

Formula One
In February 2014, Formula One team Sauber announced that de Silvestro would join the team as an "affiliated driver" and would undergo a year-long training programme with the team, with the ultimate objective of racing in 2015. De Silvestro began testing with the team at the end of April 2014 at Fiorano Circuit. She had her first drive in the 2012 Sauber on 26 April, and completed 112 laps during the test. However, in October 2014, Sauber team principal Monisha Kaltenborn stated that the team had suspended de Silvestro's driving chances due to contractual troubles.

Formula E

On 15 June 2015, it was announced de Silvestro would drive for Andretti's Formula E team at the championship's double-header finale in London. She was confirmed with the team full-time for the 2015-16 season opposite Formula Renault 3.5 champion Robin Frijns.

In 2016, de Silvestro became the first female driver to score points in Formula E with a 9th place in the 2016 Long Beach ePrix. She finished the championship in 18th place with 4 points.

V8 Supercars
It was announced on 19 August 2015 that she would partner Renee Gracie at Prodrive Racing Australia in the Bathurst 1000 for V8 Supercars. Following an impact with the wall at Forrest's Elbow on lap 15 for Gracie, the car underwent extensive repairs before being sent back out to finish 21st and 40 laps down – one more lap lost and the car would not have been classified.

On 5 September 2016 it was announced that she had signed a three-year contract as a full-time driver for Nissan Motorsport in the Australian Supercars Championship, beginning from the 2017 Series. This followed another appearance at Bathurst alongside Gracie, this time with the Nissan squad, where the pair managed to stay out of trouble amid the chaotic final laps and finish in 14th place and two laps down.

GT3
In 2020, De Silvestro returned to Europe as a factory Porsche GT driver; contesting the 2020 ADAC GT Masters for Timo Bernhard's Team75 with Klaus Bachler. She finished 23rd in the championship with 41 points. The duo switched to Herberth Motorsport for the 2021 ADAC GT Masters.

Racing record

Career summary

† As de Silvestro was a guest driver, she was ineligible to score points.

American open-wheel racing results
(key) (Races in bold indicate pole position; races in italics indicate fastest lap)

Atlantic Championship/Champ Car Atlantic

 * Podium (non-win) indicates second and third place finishes
 ** Top 10s (non-podium) indicates 4th through 10th place finishes

IndyCar Series

 1 The Las Vegas Indy 300 was abandoned after Dan Wheldon died from injuries sustained in a 15-car crash on lap 11.

Indianapolis 500

Complete Formula E results
(key) (Races in bold indicate pole position; races in italics indicate fastest lap)

Complete Supercars Championship results

Complete Bathurst 1000 results

Complete WeatherTech SportsCar Championship results
(key) (Races in bold indicate pole position; races in italics'' indicate fastest lap)

Notes

References

External links
 
 Simona de Silvestro career statistics at Driver Database
 Profile on Racing Reference
 IndyCar Driver Page
 IndyCar 11 in '11 video

1988 births
Living people
People from Thun
Atlantic Championship drivers
IndyCar Series drivers
Female IndyCar Series drivers
Indianapolis 500 Rookies of the Year
Indianapolis 500 drivers
Italian Formula Renault 2.0 drivers
Formula BMW USA drivers
Formula E drivers
Supercars Championship drivers
Swiss female racing drivers
24 Hours of Daytona drivers
Cram Competition drivers
EuroInternational drivers
Walker Racing drivers
Newman Wachs Racing drivers
US RaceTronics drivers
HVM Racing drivers
KV Racing Technology drivers
Andretti Autosport drivers
Kelly Racing drivers
Meyer Shank Racing drivers
Sportspeople from the canton of Bern
Champ Car drivers
Porsche Motorsports drivers
ADAC GT Masters drivers
Rowe Racing drivers
Nismo drivers
Sauber Motorsport drivers
Italian female racing drivers
Italian racing drivers